An audio game is an electronic game played on a device such as a personal computer. It is similar to a video game save that there is audible and tactile feedback but not visual.

Audio games originally started out as 'blind accessible'-games and were developed mostly by amateurs and blind programmers.
But more and more people are showing interest in audio games, ranging from sound artists, game accessibility researchers, mobile game developers and mainstream video gamers. Most audio games run on a personal computer platform, although there are a few audio games for handhelds and video game consoles. Audio games feature the same variety of genres as video games, such as adventure games, racing games, etc.

Audio game history 
The term "electronic game" is commonly understood as a synonym for the narrower concept of the "video game." This is understandable as both electronic games and video games have developed in parallel and the game market has always had a strong bias toward the visual. The first electronic game, in fact, is often cited to be Cathode-Ray Tube Amusement Device (1947) a decidedly visual game. Despite the difficulties in creating a visual component to early electronic games imposed by crude graphics, small view-screens, and power consumption, video games remained the primary focus of the early electronic game market.

Arcade and one-off handheld audio gamesthe early years 

Atari released the first audio game, Touch Me, in 1974. Housed in an arcade cabinet, Touch Me featured a series of lights which would flash with an accompanying tone. The player would reproduce the sequence by pressing a corresponding sequence of buttons and then the game would add another light/sound to the end of the growing sequence to continually test the player's eidetic memory in a Pelmanism-style format. Although the game featured both a visual and an auditory component, the disconnect between the two enabled both the seeing and the visually impaired to equally enjoy the game.

Based on the popularity of Touch Me, in 1978 Milton Bradley Company released a handheld audio game entitled Simon at Studio 54 in New York City.  Whereas Touch Me had been in competition with other visual-centric video games and consequently remained only a minor success, the allure of a personal electronic game allowed Simon to capture a much greater share of the market.  Simon became an immediate success eventually becoming a pop culture symbol of the 1980s.

In the decades following the release of Simon, numerous clones and variations were produced including Merlin among others. Beginning in 1996, Milton Bradley and a number of other producers released the handheld Bop It which featured a similar concept of a growing series of commands designed to test eidetic memory. Other related games soon followed including Bop It Extreme (1998), Bop It-Extreme 2 (2002–2003), Zing-It, Top-It, and Loopz (2010)

TTS software and the PCthe second wave 

Before graphical operating systems like Windows, most home computers used text-based operating systems such as DOS. Being text-based meant that they were relatively accessible to visually impaired users, requiring only the additional use of text-to-speech (TTS) software. For the same reason, following the development of TTS software, text-based games such as early text-only works of interactive fiction were also equally accessible to users with or without a visual impairment. Since the availability of such software was not commonly accessible until the inclusion of the MacInTalk program on Apple Computers in 1984, the library of games which became accessible to the vision impaired spanned everything from the earliest text adventure, Colossal Cave Adventure (1976), to the comparatively advanced works of interactive fiction which had developed in the subsequent 8 years. Although the popularity of this genre has waned in the general market as video-centric games became the dominant form of electronic game, this library is still growing with the freeware development by devoted enthusiasts of new interactive fiction titles each year.

Accessibility for the visually impaired began to change, some time prior to the advent of graphical operating systems as computers became powerful enough to support more video-centric games. This created a gap between electronic games for the seeing and games for the blind — a gap that has by now grown substantially. Due to a strong market bias in favor of the seeing, electronic games were primarily developed for this demographic. While seeing gamers could venture into 3D gaming worlds in such video game titles as Myst, Final Fantasy and Doom, blind gamers were relegated to playing more mundane games such as Blackjack, or Battleship.

As video games flourished and became increasingly common, however, amateur game designers began to adapt video games for the blind via sound. In time audio game programmers began to develop audio-only games, based to a smaller and smaller degree on existing video game ideas and instead focusing on the possibilities of game immersion and feedback with sound. Specifically, three-dimensional positional audio (binaural recording) has been developed since 2000 and now figures prominently in, for example, such audio games as BBBeat. To effect this, a sound is played in the left, center, or right channel to indicate an object's position in a virtual gaming environment.  Generally, this involves stereo panning of various sound effects, many of which are looped to serve as indicators of hazards or objects with which the user can interact. Volume also plays a major role in 3D audio games primarily to indicate an object's proximity with reference to the user. The pitch of a sound is often varied to convey other information about the object it symbolizes. Voice talent is used to indicate menu items rather than text. These parameters have allowed for the creation of, among other genres, side scrollers, 3D action adventures, shooters, and arcade style games.

The website Audiogames.net provides a list of audio games and a forum for the community of audio game developers and gamers. Many of the listed games contain some primitive graphics as to make audio games not only accessible to blind and visually impaired people but also to gamers with vision, who may be unexperienced with TTS, auditory menus and typical keyboard mappings. Examples include Shades of Doom and the CURAT Sonification game.

Console audio games and the modern era 
Most audio games are now developed by several small companies (consisting of only a team of one to four people). The main audience remains primarily visually impaired users, however the game market at large is gradually taking more notice of audio games as well due to the issue of game accessibility. Commercial interest in audio games has steadily grown and as a result artists and students have created a number of experimental freeware PC audio games to explore the possibilities and limitations of this gaming form.

In the field of console-gaming, there has been very little in the way of audio-games.  One notable exception has been the innovative incorporation of strong audio elements in several of the games produced by the Japanese video game company, Warp. Warp was founded by musician Kenji Eno and consisted of a five-man team including first-time designer Fumito Ueda.  In 1997, Warp developed a game called Real Sound for the Sega Saturn which was later ported to Dreamcast in 1999 and renamed  ("Real Sound: Regrets in the Wind"). This game featured no visuals at all and was entirely dependent upon sound.

Discussing Real Sound'''s production, Eno has stated that 

Following the release of Real Sound, Warp again made use of a novel employment of audio elements in the Saturn game Enemy Zero (1997), in which the enemies are invisible and can only be detected through auditory clues. Audio-specific elements used in gameplay have been recognized in Warp's D2 (2000).

Nintendo, as part of its shift to alternative gameplay forms, has shown recent interest in audio games through its own development teams.  In July 2006, Nintendo released a collection of audio games called Soundvoyager as the newest member of its spare Digiluxe series.  The Digiluxe series for Game Boy Advance consists of 7 games (in 2 series) that are characterized by simple yet compelling gameplay, minimal graphics, and the emphasis, in such titles as Soundvoyager and Dotstream, on music.  Soundvoyager contains 7 audio games (Sound Slalom, Sound Picker, Sound Drive, Sound Cock, Sound Chase, Sound Catcher, and Sound Cannon). The Digiluxe series has been available in Japan since July 2006.

In 2008, MIT students collaborated with the government of Singapore and a professor at the National University of Singapore to create AudiOdyssey, a game which allows both blind and sighted gamers to play together.

Apple's iPhone platform has become home to a number of audio games, including Papa Sangre, now no longer available. Other examples include, AudioGameHub, AudioWizards, AudioRallyRacing.

 TTS-enabling video games 
The rise of text-to-speech (TTS) software and steady improvements in the field have allowed full audio-conversion of traditionally video-based games. Such games were intended for use by and marketed to the seeing, however they do not actually rest primarily on the visual aspects of the game and so members of the audio game community have been able to convert them to audio games by using them in conjunction with TTS software. While this was originally only available for strictly text-based games like text adventures and MUDs, advances in TTS software have led to increased functionality with a diverse array of software types beyond text-only media allowing other works of interactive fiction as well as various simulator games to be enjoyed in a strictly audio environment.

Examples of such games include:

 A Dark Room – (Doublespeak Games, 2013)
 Hattrick – (ExtraLives AB, 1997)
 OGame – (Gameforge, 2002)
 Jennifer Government: NationStates – (Max Barry, 2002)
 Grendel's Cave – (Grendel Enterprises, 1998)

 See also 
 Binaural recording
 Dummy head recording
 Holophonics
 Interactive fiction
 List of gaming topics
 Music video game
 Video game genres
 Video game music
 IEZA Framework – a framework for conceptual game sound design

 References 

 External links 
 Game Accessibility Project, website of the Game Accessibility project
 PCS Accessible Game developers List, a big list of blind accessible games and audio games
 IGDA Game Accessibility Special Interest Group, working to make mainstream games accessible for all disability groups
 AudioGames.net, community website for audio gamers featuring a game database and a forum
 AudioGames resources, audio game resources and articles
 Accessible Gaming Rending Independence Possible (AGRIP), home of Audio Quakea project designed to make Quake'' accessible for visually impaired individuals
 The Virtual Barbershop, a demonstration of multiple binaural sound effects. (NOTE: This is intended for use with stereo headphones)
 Audio only menus, Some recommendations for the design of audio only menus for audio games.